Germat is a village in Dehdez Rural District, Dehdez District, Izeh County, Khuzestan Province, Iran. At the 2006 census, its population was 102, in 17 families.

References 

Populated places in Izeh County